GJN or gjn may refer to:

 Gallop, Johnson & Neuman, a defunct law firm based in St. Louis County, Missouri
 gjn, the ISO 639-3 code for Gonja language, Ghana